Arrin Skelley (born March 3, 1966) is an American former voice actor. He is best known for being the voice actor of Charlie Brown. Skelley also provided the voice for newly recorded soundtracks featured on Charlie Brown Records released in 1978.

Filmography
It's Your First Kiss, Charlie Brown (1977) - Charlie Brown (voice)
Tooth Brushing (1978) - Charlie Brown (voice)
You're the Greatest, Charlie Brown (1979) - Charlie Brown (voice)
Charlie Brown Clears the Air (1979) - Charlie Brown (voice)
It's Dental Flossophy, Charlie Brown (1980) - Charlie Brown (voice)
She's a Good Skate, Charlie Brown (1980) - Charlie Brown (voice)
Bon Voyage, Charlie Brown (and Don't Come Back!) (1980) - Charlie Brown (voice)

References

External links

American male voice actors
Living people
1966 births